Dalkeith Valentine Collins (31 July 1907 – 7 January 2001) was a South African cricket umpire. He stood in ten Test matches between 1949 and 1962.

See also
 List of Test cricket umpires

References

1907 births
2001 deaths
Sportspeople from Cape Town
South African Test cricket umpires